Blythe Katherine Danner (born February 3, 1943) is an American actress. Accolades she has received include two Primetime Emmy Awards for Best Supporting Actress in a Drama Series for her role as Izzy Huffstodt on Huff (2004–2006), and a Tony Award for Best Actress for her performance in Butterflies Are Free on Broadway (1969–1972). Danner was twice nominated for the Primetime Emmy for Outstanding Guest Actress in a Comedy Series for portraying Marilyn Truman on Will & Grace (2001–06; 2018–20), and the Primetime Emmy for Outstanding Lead Actress in a Miniseries or Movie for her roles in We Were the Mulvaneys (2002) and Back When We Were Grownups (2004). For the latter, she also received a Golden Globe Award nomination.

Danner played Dina Byrnes in Meet the Parents (2000) and its sequels Meet the Fockers (2004) and Little Fockers (2010). She has collaborated on several occasions with Woody Allen, appearing in three of his films: Another Woman (1988), Alice (1990), and Husbands and Wives (1992). Her other notable film credits include 1776 (1972), Hearts of the West (1975), The Great Santini (1979), Mr. and Mrs. Bridge (1990), The Prince of Tides (1991),  To Wong Foo, Thanks for Everything! Julie Newmar (1995), The Myth of Fingerprints (1997), The X-Files (1998), Forces of Nature (1999), The Love Letter (1999), The Last Kiss (2006), Paul (2011), Hello I Must Be Going (2012), I'll See You in My Dreams (2015), and What They Had (2018).

Danner is the sister of Harry Danner and the widow of Bruce Paltrow. She is the mother of actress Gwyneth Paltrow and director Jake Paltrow.

Early life 
Danner was born in Philadelphia, Pennsylvania, the daughter of Katharine (née Kile) and Harry Earl Danner, a bank executive. She has a brother, opera singer and actor Harry Danner; a sister, performer-turned-director Dorothy "Dottie" Danner; and a maternal half-brother, violin maker William Moennig III. Danner has Pennsylvania Dutch (German), and some English and Irish ancestry; her maternal grandmother was a German immigrant, and one of her paternal great-grandmothers was born in Barbados (to a family of European descent).

Danner graduated from George School, a Quaker high school located near Newtown, Bucks County, Pennsylvania, in 1960.

Career
A graduate of Bard College, Danner's first roles included the 1967 musical Mata Hari and the 1968 Off-Broadway production of Summertree. Her early Broadway appearances included Cyrano de Bergerac (1968) and her Theatre World Award-winning performance in The Miser (1969). She won the Tony Award for Best Featured Actress in a Play for portraying a free-spirited divorcée in Butterflies Are Free (1970).

In 1972, Danner portrayed Martha Jefferson in the film version of 1776. That same year, she played the unknowing wife of a husband who committed murder, opposite Peter Falk and John Cassavetes, in the Columbo episode "Etude in Black".

Her earliest starring film role was opposite Alan Alda in To Kill a Clown (1972). Danner appeared in the episode of M*A*S*H entitled "The More I See You", playing the love interest of Alda's character Hawkeye Pierce. She played lawyer Amanda Bonner in television's Adam's Rib, opposite Ken Howard as Adam Bonner.  She played Zelda Fitzgerald in F. Scott Fitzgerald and 'The Last of the Belles' (1974). She was the eponymous heroine in the film Lovin' Molly (1974) (directed by Sidney Lumet). She appeared in Futureworld, playing Tracy Ballard with co-star Peter Fonda (1976). In the 1982 TV movie Inside the Third Reich, she played the wife of Albert Speer. In the film version of Neil Simon's semi-autobiographical play Brighton Beach Memoirs (1986), she portrayed a middle-aged Jewish mother. She has appeared in two films based on the novels of Pat Conroy, The Great Santini (1979) and The Prince of Tides (1991), as well as two television movies adapted from books by Anne Tyler, Saint Maybe and Back When We Were Grownups, both for the Hallmark Hall of Fame.

Danner appeared opposite Robert De Niro in the 2000 comedy hit Meet the Parents, and its sequels, Meet the Fockers (2004) and Little Fockers (2010).

From 2001 to 2006, she regularly appeared on NBC's sitcom Will & Grace as Will Truman's mother Marilyn. From 2004 to 2006, she starred in the main cast of the comedy-drama series Huff. In 2005, she was nominated for three Primetime Emmy Awards for her work on Will & Grace, Huff, and the television film Back When We Were Grownups, winning for her role in Huff. The following year, she won a second consecutive Emmy Award for Huff. For 25 years, she has been a regular performer at the Williamstown Summer Theater Festival, where she also serves on the board of directors.

In 2006, Danner was awarded an inaugural Katharine Hepburn Medal by Bryn Mawr College's Katharine Houghton Hepburn Center. In 2015, Danner was inducted into the American Theater Hall of Fame.

Environmental activism
Danner has been involved in environmental issues such as recycling and conservation for over 30 years. She has been active with INFORM, Inc., is on the Board of Environmental Advocates of New York and the board of directors of the Environmental Media Association, and won the 2002 EMA Board of Directors Ongoing Commitment Award. In 2011, Danner joined Moms Clean Air Force, to help call on parents to join in the fight against toxic air pollution.

Health care activism
After the death of her husband Bruce Paltrow from oral cancer, she became involved with the nonprofit Oral Cancer Foundation. In 2005, she filmed a public service announcement to raise public awareness of the disease and the need for early detection. She has since appeared on morning talk shows and given interviews in such magazines as People. The Bruce Paltrow Oral Cancer Fund, administered by the Oral Cancer Foundation, raises funding for oral cancer research and treatment, with a particular focus on those communities in which healthcare disparities exist.

She has also appeared in commercials for Prolia, a brand of denosumab used in the treatment of osteoporosis.

Personal life
Danner was married to producer and director Bruce Paltrow, who died of oral cancer in 2002. She and Paltrow had two children together, actress Gwyneth Paltrow and director Jake Paltrow.

Danner's niece is the actress Katherine Moennig, the daughter of her maternal half-brother William.

Danner co-starred with her daughter in the 1992 television film Cruel Doubt and again in the 2003 film Sylvia, in which she portrayed Aurelia Plath, mother to Gwyneth's title role of Sylvia Plath.

Danner is a practitioner of transcendental meditation, which she has described as "very helpful and comforting".

Filmography

Film

Television

Stage

References

External links

 
 
 
 Stage biography from Playbill website
 2003 article from the Environmental Media Association
 Blythe Danner interview: Leading Ladies Working in the Theatre video from American Theatre Wing, December 2006
 Working in the Theatre: Performance video seminar at American Theatre Wing, April 1998
 Working in the Theatre: Performance video seminar at American Theatre Wing, April 1988

1943 births
Living people
20th-century American actresses
21st-century American actresses
American environmentalists
Actresses from Philadelphia
American film actresses
American people of Barbadian descent
American people of Pennsylvania Dutch descent
American stage actresses
American television actresses
American voice actresses
Bard College alumni
Outstanding Performance by a Supporting Actress in a Drama Series Primetime Emmy Award winners
Tony Award winners
George School alumni
Paltrow family